Karim Abokahla (born 11 November 1996) is an Egyptian weightlifter. He won the gold medal in the men's 89kg event at the 2019 African Games held in Rabat, Morocco. He also won two silver medals at the 2022 Mediterranean Games held in Oran, Algeria.

Career 

He represented Egypt at the 2019 African Games held in Rabat, Morocco and he won the gold medal in the men's 89kg event.

In 2021, he competed in the men's 89kg event at the World Weightlifting Championships held in Tashkent, Uzbekistan. He won the silver medals in the men's 89kg Snatch and Clean & Jerk events at the 2022 Mediterranean Games held in Oran, Algeria.

Achievements

References

External links 
 

Living people
1996 births
Place of birth missing (living people)
Egyptian male weightlifters
African Games medalists in weightlifting
African Games gold medalists for Egypt
Competitors at the 2019 African Games
Competitors at the 2022 Mediterranean Games
Mediterranean Games silver medalists for Egypt
Mediterranean Games medalists in weightlifting
21st-century Egyptian people